Ochetellus democles is a species of ant in the genus Ochetellus. Described by Francis Walker in 1839, the ant was originally thought to be a small wasp based on a male collected by Charles Darwin. It was first recognised as an ant in 1988.

References

Dolichoderinae
Insects described in 1839
Hymenoptera of Australia